The University Museum A Domus do Mitreo is a museum center built on the old site of the Pazo de Montenegro and annexed buildings, next to the Roman walls of Lugo. The Museum is called Domus do Mitreo because when archaeological surveys were carried out, prior to the construction of the new building, the remains of a domus appeared. This domus, during the Lower Roman Empire, was partially reformed to build a private building intended for use as a Mithraeum. The historical importance of the archaeological remains discovered led to revise the architectural project initially planned to preserve and incorporate them into the new building.

References

Bibliography

External links 

 English Official Website

Museums in Galicia (Spain)
Roman archaeology